Ieuan Lloyd (1914–1989) was a professional rugby league footballer who played in the 1930s.

Playing career

Rugby Union
Prior to signing for Barrow he played RU for Cross Keys, Penarth, Leicester & Rugby Lions.

Barrow RLFC
He signed for Barrow on 20 Sep 1935 from Rugby Lions RUFC, and made his home debut the following day on 21 Sep 1935 v Widnes
His last game was on 30 Mar 1940 v Salford (away)

1935/6 season 37 appearances, 18 tries, 1 goal, 56pts

1936/7 season 40 appearances, 11 tries, 1 goal, 35pts

1937/8 season 45 appearances, 11 tries, 6 goals, 45pts

1938/9 3 appearances Injured for nearly all this season.

1939/40 season, 14 appearances, 3 tries, 9pts

Challenge Cup Final appearances
Ieuan Lloyd played  in Barrow's 4-7 defeat by Salford in the 1938 Challenge Cup Final during the 1937–38 season at Wembley on Saturday 7 May 1938.

County Cup Final appearances
Ieuan Lloyd played  in Barrow's 4-8 defeat by Warrington in the 1937 Lancashire County Cup Final during the 1937–38 season at Central Park, Wigan on Saturday 23 October 1937.

Post-playing
He was demobbed from forces in September 1946, living briefly in Barrow before returning to South Wales.

References

External links
Search for "Lloyd" at rugbyleagueproject.org

1914 births
1989 deaths
Barrow Raiders players
British military personnel of World War II
Cross Keys RFC players
Leicester Tigers players
Penarth RFC players
Rugby league five-eighths
Rugby league players from Rhondda Cynon Taf
Rugby union players from Treorchy
Welsh rugby league players
Welsh rugby union players